Dick Degen (born March 4, 1942) is a former American football linebacker. He played for the San Diego Chargers from 1965 to 1966.

References

1942 births
Living people
American football linebackers
Long Beach State 49ers football players
San Diego Chargers players